Baba Banda Bahadur Public School is a private secondary school in Rohtak, Haryana, India. It is a co-educational day  school with around 700 students. The school is affiliated to the Central Board of Secondary Education (CBSE). The school has been operating officially under the trust/society Baba Banda Bahadur Sewa Samiti.
It was founded in 1997.

History
Baba Banda Bahadur Public School located in Rohtak, was established in the year 1996. The school is English medium Co-Educational school affiliated to Central Board of Secondary Education (CBSE). This school provides education to 700+ students by 30+ teachers.

Campus
The school is a co-educational day school with 700 students.
The Sports Complex has facilities for volleyball, cricket, football, basketball, lawn tennis, table tennis, and badminton.

Notable alumni

Multiple IITians, AIIMS alumni

See also
Education in India
Literacy in India  
Amity International School, Gurgaon
List of institutions of higher education in Haryana

References

External links

Central Board of Secondary Education
Private schools in Haryana
Education in Rohtak